Long Yang (born December 17, 1989) is a Chinese television hostess for China Central Television. She is from Chenzhou, Hunan, China. In 2009, she made her debut as a contestant on host show I am the master on screen and got into Top 48. In 2013, she competed in  hosts' dance show Dance Nanjing and became the winner.

In 2015, she began to host financial informative program Time No.1 on CCTV-2.

Career
In July 2009, Long Yang competed in the host show I am the master on screen. She finished in the Top 48.

In 2011, Long Yang became a hostess. She hosted in news program Live Nanjing on Nanjing Television after graduating from Nanjing University of the Arts. In June 2012, she hosted her own talk show:Long Yang's Talk Show on Nanjing Television.

In February 2013, she competed in hosts' dance  show Dance Nanjing and won the championship. In August 2013, she competed in Super Speaker on Anhui Television and got into Top 16.

In January 2014, she hosted 2014 Spring Festival Gala of Cities with Yang Lan.

In 2015, Long Yang got into CCTV and began to host financial informative program Time No.1. In this program, she hosts a talk show named Morning Talk Show. On the Chinese New Year's Eve of 2016, Long Yang hosted the CCTV Spring Festival Gala and a program related to it:@Spring Festival Gala with Wen Jin.

Discography

TV programs

Speeches

Awards
On February 3, 2013, Long Yang won the championship of host show Dance Nanjing.

References

External links 
Long Yang's Sina Weibo
Complete list of CCTV hosts

1989 births
Living people
CCTV television presenters
People from Chenzhou